An All-American team is an honorary sports team that is generally composed of the best amateur players of a specific season for each team position—who in turn are given the honorific "All-America" and typically referred to as "All-American athletes", or simply "All-Americans".  The term is used in U.S. team sports to refer to players who are selected by members of the national media.  Walter Camp selected the first All-America team in the early days of American football in 1889.

Both the McDonald's All-American team selection and the Jordan Brand All-American team selection have associated high school basketball all-star games held in conjunction with them, in which the players are divided into two teams to compete in an exhibition game. The Jordan Brand held its first contest in 2002.  McDonald's All-Americans have competed in such contests since 1977, and a girls' game was added in 2002.  Both the Parade and USA Today lists included underclassmen, but fifth-year seniors were ineligible for the Parade team.  Those lists also both designated ordinal teams as first team, second team, etc., while the McDonald's and Jordan Brand teams were selected without distinction among selectees. In basketball, some All-American teams are composed by position, while others were not.

In 2006, 47 boys' high-school basketball players were selected to major honorary All-American teams. For the 2006 selections, McDonald's selected 24 players to its All-American team; the Jordan Brand included 21 players, and the USA Today All-USA prep basketball team had 15.  The list also includes the 40 Parade All-Americans, the largest of the four teams. The 2006 class of McDonald's All-Americans is regarded as the best class of the decade, with approximately 22 of the 24 expected to make it to the National Basketball Association by the time they have exhausted their collegiate eligibility, which in most cases is four years of competition in five years of enrollment.

Sherron Collins, Kevin Durant, Wayne Ellington, Spencer Hawes, Tywon Lawson, Greg Oden, Brandan Wright and Thaddeus Young were named to all four lists. Among this group, Durant, Hawes, Lawson and Oden were selected to the first team of both organizations that enumerated their selections.  Collins was the only one of these to go undrafted. Oden and Derrick Rose were both NBA draft overall number-one selections, in 2007 and 2008, respectively. Gerald Henderson, Jr. was the highest selection in the 2009 NBA draft (12th overall). Damion James and Stanley Robinson were the only selections from this group in the 2010 NBA draft. Kyle Singler and Vernon Macklin were the final draftees from this group in the 2011 NBA draft.

All-American teams
The table below details the selections for four major 2006 boys' high-school basketball All-American teams.  For those teams where teams were enumerated as first, second, etc. team, the number corresponding to this designation appears in the table.  For teams where no such enumeration exists, a check mark is used.  The following columns are included in the table:

Player – The name of the High School All-American
College – Collegiate affiliation
Draft – The NBA draft Year
Position – Overall position that the player was chosen in his draft year
McD – McDonald's All-American Team
Parade – Parade All-America Team
Jordan – Jordan Brand All-American Team
USAT – USA Today All-USA Team
N/A – not drafted
TBD – will be eligible for the draft at a future time
??? – remaining eligibility not clear in currently available sources
— – player not named to any team by that selector

Notes

High school basketball in the United States